Beauty and the Barge is a 1914 British silent comedy film directed by Harold M. Shaw and starring Cyril Maude, Lillian Logan and Gregory Scott. It is an adaptation of the 1905 play Beauty and the Barge by W. W. Jacobs. A sound version of the same story was released in 1937.

Cast
 Cyril Maude - Captain Barley
 Lillian Logan - Ethel Smedley
 Gregory Scott - Lieutenant Seton Boyne
 Mary Brough - Mrs. Baldwin
 Judd Green - Dibbs

References

External links

1914 films
1914 comedy films
1910s English-language films
British comedy films
British films based on plays
Films based on works by W. W. Jacobs
Films directed by Harold M. Shaw
British silent short films
Films set in England
Seafaring films
British black-and-white films
1910s British films
Silent comedy films
Silent adventure films